Turaka is a possibly extinct Papuan language of New Guinea.

References

Languages of Milne Bay Province
Endangered Papuan languages
Endangered languages of Oceania
Critically endangered languages
Dagan languages